Neikirk is a surname. Notable people with the surname include:

Derick Neikirk (born 1974), American wrestler and baseball player
Henry Neikirk (1839–1911), American gold miner, banker, and politician

See also
Newkirk (disambiguation)